Johannes Hansen may refer to:

 Johannes Hansen (mayor) (1695–1756), mayor of Albany, New York
 Johannes Hansen (gymnast) (1882–1959), Danish gymnast
 Johannes Hansen (sculptor) (1903–1995), Danish sculptor
 Johannes Hansen (mayor) (1695–1756), mayor of Albany, New York
 Johannes Hansen (manufacturer), a Danish furniture manufacturer 
 Johannes Hansen (footballer)